Aethes matheri is a species of moth of the family Tortricidae. It is found in the United States, where it has been recorded from Florida, Illinois, Indiana, Maine, Maryland, Michigan, Mississippi, Missouri, North Carolina, Pennsylvania, Tennessee and Texas.

The ground color of the forewings is variable, but usually cream or buff. The markings are buff and brown or cinnamon. The hindwings are pale drab. Adults have been recorded on wing from March to November in the southern part of the range, suggesting two generations per year. In the northern part of the range, adults have been recorded in May and June, probably in one generation per year.

Etymology
The species is named in honor of Bryant Mather.

References

matheri
Moths described in 2002
Moths of North America